The 2012 FIBA Europe Under-16 Championship was the 26th edition of the FIBA Europe Under-16 Championship. 16 teams featured in the competition, which was held in Latvia and Lithuania, from 19 to 29 July 2012. Turkey won the title for the third time.

Participating teams

  (runners-up, 2011 FIBA Europe Under-16 Championship Division B)

  (winners, 2011 FIBA Europe Under-16 Championship Division B)

Group stages

First round
In this round, the sixteen teams are allocated in four groups of four teams each. The top three advanced to the qualifying round. The last team of each group played for the 13th–16th place in the Classification Games.

Times given below are in CEST (UTC+2).

Group A

Group B

Group C

Group D

Second round
The best twelve teams will be allocated in two groups of six teams each. The four top teams will advance to the quarterfinals. The last two teams of each group will play for the 9th–12th place.

Group E

Group F

Classification round
The last teams of each group in the first round will compete in this classification round. The four teams played in one group. The last two teams will be relegated to Division B for the next season.

Group G

Knockout round

Championship

Quarterfinals

Semifinals

Bronze medal game

Final

5th–8th-place playoffs

Classification 5–8

7th-place game

5th-place game

9th–12th-place playoffs

Classification 9–12

11th-place game

9th-place game

Final standings

Awards

All-Tournament Team

 Federico Mussini
 Étienne Ory
 Okben Ulubay
 Jan Wimberg
 Marko Arapović

Broadcasting rights 
 – Lietuvos rytas TV

References

External links
FIBA Archive
FIBA Europe

FIBA U16 European Championship
2012–13 in European basketball
2012–13 in Latvian basketball
2012–13 in Lithuanian basketball
International youth basketball competitions hosted by Latvia
International youth basketball competitions hosted by Lithuania
Sports competitions in Vilnius
July 2012 sports events in Europe
21st century in Vilnius